Cape York is a location on Mars, on the western rim of Endeavour crater. The Opportunity rover spent about two years exploring this portion of the rim in the early 2010s before moving south. The CRISM instrument on the Mars Reconnaissance Orbiter identified clay smectites in an area of Cape York, and the rover was sent to explore this location. MER-B Opportunity spend its fifth Martian Winter at Greeley Haven at Cape York, and also took a panorama at that location. MER-B spent 19 weeks stationed at Greeley Haven surviving the winter and went on the move again in May 2012, to further explore Cape York.

MER-B arrived at Cape York in 2011 at Odyssey crater, which is on the southern end of the feature. Opportunity arrived at Endeavour crater on sol  (August 9, 2011), at a landmark called Spirit Point named after its rover twin, after traversing  from Victoria crater, over a three-year period. Spirit point was the name selected for where MER-B arrived at Endeavour's Cape York, a journey which it set out on in 2008 and it arrived there in the summer of 2011.

Locations and science targets at Cape York include: (Alphabetically ordered:)
Chester Lake
Esperance
Grasberg
Greeley Haven
Homestake rock
Matijevic Hill
Monte Cristo
Odyssey crater 
Spirit Point
Tisdale 2
Whitewater Lake outcrops
Whim Creek

South of Cape York is an area called Botany Bay. Features south of Cape York include Sutherland Point, Nobby's Head, and even father south Solander Point

Location

MER-B traverse around Cape York

Locations and/or science targets at Cape York

Matijevic Hill

Views

See also
Solander Point

References

External links
The Planetary Society - Mars Exploration Rovers Special Update: Opportunitys Findings at Endeavour, So Far (2013)
Image from above TPS article

Exploration of Mars
Surface features of Mars
Mars Exploration Rover mission
Margaritifer Sinus quadrangle